M.C. Ahamed was a Sri Lankan politician, a former member of Parliament for Kalmunai electorate and former chairman of Kalmunai town council. A close ally of the Late Srimavo Bandaranayake under the SLFP Government. He was a strong member of the SLFP. He didn't care about race or religion, was a nationalist who extended his service to the people of all community.

Born on 20 February 1931 to Mohamed Cassim Kariapper( who are originally from Kalmunai) & Madania Kariapper( Sister of M. S. Kariapper). He had two sisters and one brother. He had eight children and numerous grandchildren and great-grandchildren. He was brought up by his uncle as his parents died at a young age.

He was elected to parliament in 1960 served till 1977. He was the nephew of M. S. Kariapper. He comes from a famous and powerful political family  from the eastern province of Sri Lanka known as the Kariapper family. He contested against his maternal uncle M. S. Kariapper in 1960 and won. During his tenure he incorporated Mahmud ladies college of kalmunai, also a founding member. He was in parliament for 17 years. Also, he was the chairman of the council (Back then you can hold on to both posts).

The irony of the first three election is he contested against his own uncle ( M. S. Kariapper Former minister). In which he won 2 and the 3rd he lost but his uncle was impeached with in few months of the parliament session began. He won the by election. He was married to  Sayathu nachi who died in 1993,he had nine children of which one child died just two months after birth and another child Sabriya died in 2004 at the age of thirteen nine.  He had several grandchildren and great-grandchildren at the time of his death.

His Son in law M M Mohamed Musthaffa was a parliamentarian. His cousin  M. H. M. Ashraff is the founder of Sri Lanka Muslim Congress.

Achievements 

A few of his achievements during his tenure as Member of Parliament for Kalmunai Electorate.

1) He founded Mahmud ladies college and emphasized on women's education. kalmunai which is predominantly a Muslim area, where girls don't get educated after a certain age. Today because of him, there are many women from kalmunai and neighbouring town who are educated.

2) Through his initiation he got government institutions such as peoples bank, CWE and salu sala opened up operations.

3) During his period he introduced science A/ls for zahira college kalmunai. As a result, the school produced engineering and medical students.

4) He funded the science laboratory and brought in teachers from outside the area, through the education ministry.

5) He built roads & Bridges, expanded the bazar.

6) In order to develop cultivation he made canals to avoid floods.

7) In 1974 he spoke in the parliament for the need of a university in the eastern province.

8) He always wanted create a fully equipped hospital in kalmunai, he was able to only start an Ayurveda hospital through the funds, which was allocated to the town council. As the Health ministry at that time did not provide any funding. Today that hospital is called Ashraff memorial hospital. Thanks to Late M H M Ashraff and A H M Fowzie. Kalmunai has a fully equipped hospital.

9) To develop the fisheries industry in the area, he provided the first engine boats to fisherman.

10) When it came to education he did not concentrate only his constituency. He helped by providing science laboratory to the schools in the AMPARA district through the education minister.

11) He provided jobs for Thousands of people. He was always there to serve the people. These are few notable things he has done during his tenure. He was offered a deputy ministerial portfolio in 1970 but he refused to accept it unless it was education, fisheries or agriculture as non-other ministries would benefit the people of his constituency.

He was fierce politician, was ready to face anything. He would go to extreme lengths in order to achieve what he wants. One of the strongest allies of Srimavo Bandaranaike, more importantly he cared about the people. He had to relocate his supporters during an internal conflict in the area; he got them state lands and compensation from the government. He did this all keeping in mind that his voter base is being relocated, as their safety came before anything else. Which eventually led to his defeat, but he actually won. The people of that electorate are able to enjoy now what he had initiated 30 years ago. He moved from the federal party as their views were different sat as an independent MP in the parliament following election he contested as an SLFP candidate. No one would do that today. He is non communal and a nationalist. He has saved many people from the LTTE. He was one of few politicians who were allowed to go in to the LTTE controlled areas and return alive. People were always in his mind.

References 

2008 deaths
Sri Lankan Muslims
Year of birth missing
Illankai Tamil Arasu Kachchi politicians
Sri Lanka Freedom Party politicians
Members of the 5th Parliament of Ceylon
Members of the 6th Parliament of Ceylon
Members of the 7th Parliament of Ceylon